() is a dialect of Leonese or Extremaduran spoken in the subregion of El Rebollar, in Salamanca (Spain): Navasfrías, El Payo, Peñaparda, Villasrubias and Robleda.
Some authors calculate more speakers among the Rebollar emigrants in France than in the dialect original area.

Characteristics
Final vocals are closed in "-I" and "-U" (in Spanish the same final vocals are in "-E" and "-O"): "perru" (Spanish perro, English dog), "ríu" (Spanish río, English river), "verdi" (Spanish verde, English green),...
Article is used with the possessive adjective. "La mi cassa" (Spanish Mi casa, English my house), "el mi dagal" (Spanish mi niño, English my child, my son),...
Although most words exhibiting it are no longer used, a common plural ending was -is. Examples: las cucharis, las vaquis.

Recognition

Some of the Rebollar villages have labelled streets and trekking routes in Spanish and Palra.

References

External links
 La Gurulla, journal in ''palra d'El Rebollal

Leonese language
Extremaduran language
Province of Salamanca